Jacopo Bedi, also known by Giacomo di Bedo di Benedetto (active 1432 – 1458) was an Italian painter of the Quattrocento.

Biography
He was born in Gubbio, and active there, where he was felt to be a pupil of Ottaviano Nelli. There is one signed work by him, frescoes depicting the Life of St Sebastian for the Panfili Chapel in the cemetery of San Secondo in Gubbio from 1458.

References

15th-century Italian painters
Quattrocento painters
Italian male painters
Umbrian painters
Year of birth unknown
Year of death unknown
People from Gubbio
Year of birth uncertain